This is a list of Croatian television related events from 1967.

Events

Debuts

Television shows

Ending this year

Births
8 July - Igor Mešin, actor and TV host
13 November - Davor Meštrović, journalist and TV host

Deaths